Reginald Mervyn Bulford Anderson (25 April 1914 – 12 August 1972) was a Welsh first-class cricketer who played his only game for Glamorgan in 1946 against Hampshire. He was an opening bowler. He also played for Glamorgan Second XI in the Minor Counties Championship.

References

External links
 
 

Welsh cricketers
Glamorgan cricketers
1914 births
1972 deaths